Vladimir Grigoryevich Tarnopolsky (born April 30, 1955 in Dnipropetrovsk, Ukrainian SSR) is a Russian composer.

Biography
Tarnopolsky studied composition at the Moscow Conservatory with Nikolai Sidelnikov and Edison Denisov and music theory with Yuri Kholopov. He graduated from the conservatory in 1978, and completed post-graduate studies in 1980. Later he became professor of the Moscow Conservatory.

In 1990 he became a member of ACM - Association for Contemporary Music. When the association split in two parts, Tarnopolsky became a leader of a splinter group called CCMM - "Centre for Contemporary Music, Moscow"  based on the Moscow Conservatory. He also ran the ensemble "Studio of New Music".

Tarnopolsky is one of the main participants and organizers of the "rccr-projects" founded by Valery Gergiev. According to the Federal Agency for the Commonwealth of Independent States Affairs, Compatriots Living Abroad, and International Humanitarian Cooperation Tarnopolsky is one of the leading representatives of the "soft-power"-politics of Russia.

He wrote operas, one symphony, concertos, orchestral works, chamber and vocal music.

Compositions

Cassandra for large ensemble (1991)
Chevengur for voice and ensemble, text by Andrey Platonov (2001) 13'
Cinderella theatrical cantata for children's choir, children's orchestra, 6 narrators and professional ensemble 2003 60' Text: Roald Dahl's "Revolting Rhymes" adapted by Donald Sturrock,  premiere: 28 April 2003, Barbican, London, Centre for Young Musicians orchestra and London Schools Symphony Orchestra, conductor Peter Ash
Feux follets, for orchestra (2003) 10'
Foucault's Pendulum, for orchestra (2004) 25'

Operas 
The Three Graces, an opera-parody in three scenes Text: Carl Maria von Weber (1988) 45' premiere: April 30, 1988, Bolshoi Hall of Shostakovich Philharmony, Leningrad, Orchestra and Choir of Culture Ministry USSR, cond. Gennady Rozhdestvensky
Wenn die Zeit über die Ufer tritt (When Time Overflows From Its Shores, opera in three scenes Text: Ralf Günther Mohnnau after Anton Chekhov's Three Sisters, commissioned for the Munich Biennale,(1999) 90', premiere:  April 27, 1999, Münchener Biennale, Staatstheater am Gärtnerplatz, conductor Ekkehard Klemm

References

Valeria Tsenova: The "culturology" of Vladimir Tarnopolsky;  List of Vladimir Tarnopolsky's principal works in «Ex oriente...II» Nine Composers from the former USSR:  Andrei Volkonsky, Sergei Slonimsky, Alemdar Karamanov, Valentin Silvestrov, Nikolai Karetnikov, Roman Ledenyov, Faraj Karaev, Victor Ekimovsky, Vladimir Tarnopolsky      (studia slavica musicologica, Bd. 30), Edited by Valeria Tsenova  245 pp., music illus., English Edition.

External links
Composer’s site
List of Works

1955 births
Living people
Russian male classical composers
Russian opera composers
Male opera composers